Interstate 55 (I-55) is a major north–south Interstate Highway that serves the middle of the United States.

Route description
The highway parallels US 51 during its trek roughly through the center of the Magnolia State. North of Jackson, the Interstate runs east of the bluffs of the Mississippi Delta.

I-55 then intersects US 84 near Brookhaven and becomes concurrent with US 51 near Crystal Springs. In Jackson, the highway is concurrent with I-20 for three exits, and US 51 leaves the concurrency after I-55's concurrency with I-20 begins. I-55 continues north on the eastern side of Jackson and meets the northern terminus of I-220 near Ridgeland. The highway then parallels US 51 until the U.S. Highway crosses over to the western side of the Interstate in Grenada. I-55 intersects US 278 at Batesville, and it becomes concurrent with I-69 north of Hernando. The highway crosses the state line north of Southaven into Tennessee.

History

Exit list

References

55
 Mississippi
Transportation in Pike County, Mississippi
Transportation in Lincoln County, Mississippi
Transportation in Copiah County, Mississippi
Transportation in Hinds County, Mississippi
Transportation in Rankin County, Mississippi
Transportation in Madison County, Mississippi
Transportation in Yazoo County, Mississippi
Transportation in Holmes County, Mississippi
Transportation in Carroll County, Mississippi
Transportation in Montgomery County, Mississippi
Transportation in Grenada County, Mississippi
Transportation in Yalobusha County, Mississippi
Transportation in Panola County, Mississippi
Transportation in Tate County, Mississippi
Transportation in DeSoto County, Mississippi